Vishera Nature Reserve (also Vishersky) is a Russian zapovednik (strict nature reserve) in the middle latitudes of the Ural Mountains in Perm Krai, Russia.  It covers an area of 2,412 km2, more than 75% of which is dark coniferous forest (taiga).  An additional 20% of the territory is treeless mountain landscape.  The Vishera, flows through nature reserve for about 130 km.  Administratively, the reserve is located in the extreme north-east of Perm Krai, in Krasnovishersky District.

Topography  
The reserve occupies 1.5% of Perm Krai's area (comparable to the size of Luxembourg).  The highest peak in the reserve territory Tulymsky Kamen (1,469 m), also the highest point of Perm Krai.  The lowest point is 231 m above sea level.

The extreme north point of the nature reserve (that is also the most northern point in Perm Krai) is divided basins of Kama River, Pechora River and Ob River.  The small population of this place is made up of the Mansi people.

Ecoregion and climate
Vishersky is in the Urals montane tundra and taiga ecoregion, a region the runs north–south along the ridge of the Urals Mountains that separates the Russian Plain from the West Siberian Plain.

The climate of Vishersky is Humid continental climate, cool summer (Köppen climate classification Subarctic climate(Dfc)). This climate is characterized by mild summers (only 1–3 months above ) and cold, snowy winters (coldest month below ).

Flora and fauna  
Large area of fir and spruce virgin forest. Also you can find here Siberian Pine, mountain ash and birch. 
There are 36 species of mammals, 155 – birds, 6 – fishes and 2 amphibians. Among mammals there are Brown Bear, Gray wolf, Reindeer, Sable and others.

References

External links 
 Map boundaries of Vishera Reserve on OpenStreetMap.org
 Map boundaries of Vishera Reserve on ProtectedPlanet.net

Nature reserves in Russia
1991 establishments in Russia
Protected areas established in 1991
Geography of Perm Krai
Zapovednik